Ratcliff or Ratcliffe is a locality in the London Borough of Tower Hamlets. It lies on the north bank of the River Thames between Limehouse (to the east), and Shadwell (to the west). The place name is no longer commonly used.

History

Etymology and origin
The name Ratcliffe derives from the small sandstone cliff that stood above the surrounding marshes, it had a red appearance, hence Red-cliffe.

Ratcliff was historically part of the Manor and Ancient Parish of Stepney. The place name Stepney evolved from Stybbanhyð, first recorded around 1000 AD. Stybbanhyð probably translates into modern English as "Stybba's hithe (landing place)", with Stybba the individual who owned the Manor (estate).

Civil and ecclesiastical administration
The hamlet was divided between the parishes of Limehouse and Stepney until 1866, when it was constituted a separate civil parish (as Ratcliffe). From 1855 it was administered by Limehouse District Board of Works, and in 1900 became part of the Metropolitan Borough of Stepney. By the latter half of the nineteenth century, the condition of the area had improved somewhat - the 1868 'National Gazetteer of Great Britain and Ireland' describes Ratcliffe as inhabited by persons connected with shipping and having extensive warehouses, with the area 'well paved, lighted with gas, and supplied with water from the reservoir at Old Ford'.

The parish church of Ratcliffe, St. James in Butcher Row, was built in 1838 and served the area until 1951 (it was damaged during the Second World War), when the parish was merged with St. Paul, Shadwell. In 1948 the church site became (and remains) the East London home of the Royal Foundation of St. Katharine.

History

Ratcliffe in earlier times was also known as "sailor town".  It was originally known for shipbuilding but from the fourteenth century more for fitting and provisioning ships. In the sixteenth century various voyages of discovery were supplied and departed from Ratcliffe, including those of Willoughby and Frobisher. By the early seventeenth century it had the largest population of any Hamlet (administrative sub-division) in Stepney, with 3500 residents.

It was again a site of shipbuilding in the seventeenth century - a number of sailing warships were built for the Royal Navy here, including one of the earliest frigates, the Constant Warwick in 1645. Located at the western end of Narrow Street it was made up of lodging houses, bars, brothels, music halls and opium dens. This overcrowded and squalid district acquired an unsavoury reputation with a large transient population.  In 1794 approximately half of the hamlet was destroyed in a fire but, even so, it continued as a notorious slum well into the nineteenth century.

From the late sixteenth century Ratcliffe and surrounding areas were notable areas for non-conformist Christianity. John Penry preached in the area in 1592/3, until he was spotted by the local vicar at Ratcliffe and subsequently hanged. By 1669 around 200 Presbyterians were worshipping at a warehouse at Ratcliffe Cross and there was a purpose built Quaker meeting house in Schoolhouse Lane, which was demolished by soldiers in 1670.

In late 1811 seven murders took place in Ratcliffe Highway (more recently St. George's Street), allegedly committed by a sailor named Williams, who committed suicide after being captured. The murders were later fictionalised in an account by Thomas De Quincey.

The Ratcliffe Fire
The Ratcliffe Fire was the largest fire disaster in London between the Great Fire of 1666 and the Blitz in 1940.  The fire took place in July 1794 when a smaller fire ignited a barge loaded with saltpetre.  The conflagration that followed destroyed over 400 homes and 20 warehouses and left 1000 people homeless. Following the fire tents were set up near to St. Dunstan's Church whilst the area was rebuilt.

Population and area
The hamlet of Ratcliffe covered  and had a Census population of:

Hamlet of Ratcliffe 1801-1901

See also
 Ratcliff Highway murders
 St Dunstan's, Stepney
 The Highway (London)
 Cable Street
 Stepney Historical Trust

References

External links and information
Ratcliffe https://web.archive.org/web/20051226015402/http://www.eolfhs.org.uk/parish/ratcliff.htm
Ratcliffe https://web.archive.org/web/20060213214435/http://www.eastlondonhistory.com/ratcliff.htm
The Ratcliffe waterfront http://www.portcities.org.uk/london/upload/img_200/PX9445.jpg
The Museum in Docklands has an area set up to look like 'Sailortown' and information about the Ratcliffe Fire
1903 description of the Parish of St James, Ratcliff by Walter Besant

History of local government in London (pre-1855)
History of the London Borough of Tower Hamlets
Parishes united into districts (Metropolis)
Port of London
Limehouse
Stepney
Shadwell